Constant Throb is an album by American saxophonist and composer John Klemmer released on the Impulse! label.

Reception
The Allmusic review awarded the album 4½ stars.

Track listing
All compositions by John Klemmer
 "Constant Throb Part I" - 2:03 
 "Constant Throb Part II" - 6:24 
 "Neptune" - 5:11 
 "Let Me Touch the Wind" - 6:47 
 "California Jazz Dance" - 4:19 
 "Rainbows" - 5:38 
 "Crystaled Tears" - 4:37 
 "Precious Leaf" - 5:45 
Recorded at Western Recorders in Los Angeles, California on August 12 (tracks 1-3, 5, 6 & 8) and August 19 (tracks 4 & 7), 1971

Personnel
John Klemmer - tenor saxophone, soprano saxophone, electric piano, percussion, echoplex
Don Menza - alto flute, bass clarinet
Mike Lang - piano, electric piano
Mike Wofford - electric piano, clavinet
Howard Roberts - guitar
Wilton Felder, Reggie Johnson - bass
Jim Keltner, Shelly Manne - drums
Gary Coleman, Mark Stevens - percussion
Marni Nixon - vocals (tracks 1 & 2)

References

Impulse! Records albums
John Klemmer albums
1972 albums